The 2015 University of Louisville basketball sex scandal involved National Collegiate Athletic Association (NCAA) rules violations committed by the University of Louisville (U of L) men's basketball program. The scandal centered around improper benefits given by former Director of Basketball Operations and Louisville player Andre McGee to prospective players and former Louisville players.

Katina Powell
In October 2015, Yahoo! Sports reported that the University of Louisville was investigating allegations made by Katina Powell, who described herself as a madam. Powell alleged that she had been paid several thousand dollars from 2010 to 2014 to provide women to dance for and have sex with Cardinals players and recruits. Many of the alleged parties took place at Minardi Hall, the men's basketball dormitory; others took place at off-campus locations. The allegations came out in advance of the release of Breaking Cardinal Rules: Basketball and the Escort Queen, a book written by Powell and Indianapolis-based investigative journalist Dick Cady. In the book, Powell named Andre McGee, a former Cardinals assistant and in 2015 the team's director of operations, as having paid her for these services.

Andre McGee

McGee graduated from Canyon Springs High School in Moreno Valley, California, in 2005. That fall, he enrolled at Louisville, where he played for the Cardinals for four seasons. He helped the 2007–08 Cardinals reach the Elite Eight in the 2008 NCAA tournament. As the starting point guard during his senior year, he led the 2008–09 Cardinals to the Big East regular season and Big East tournament championships. The team earned the No. 1 overall seed in the 2009 NCAA tournament and again advanced to the Elite Eight. He played in 127 career games, including 57 starts, while averaging 5.2 points per game for the Cardinals.

After his playing career at Louisville, McGee played briefly in the Basketball Bundesliga in Germany. He then served as a program assistant and Director of Basketball Operations under head coach Rick Pitino from 2010 to 2014. It was during this time that McGee committed NCAA violations by acquiring and paying for striptease dances and sexual acts for prospective players and players on his current roster. The violations occurred from December 2010 until June 2014.

Findings

The NCAA found Louisville head coach Pitino guilty of a Level I charge. NCAA bylaws 11.1.2.1 and 11.1.1.1 require the head coach to monitor all recruiting activities to ensure that they are complied with. Pitino failed to monitor that his director of basketball operations, McGee, complied with NCAA rules when Pitino gave McGee recruiting responsibilities.

The NCAA found that McGee engaged  in  unethical  conduct  and  failed  to cooperate  when  he  refused  to  participate  in  interviews  or  provide relevant information to the enforcement staff during the investigation, which constituted violations of NCAA bylaws 10.01.1, 10.1, 19.2.3, and 10.1-(a).

Penalties
Pitino was set to be suspended for the first five games of the 2017–18 Atlantic Coast Conference men's basketball season, but Louisville fired him in October 2017, before the season started.

The program also had 123 wins from December 2010 to April 2014 vacated, including the 2012 Final Four and the 2013 national championship. The Cardinals were the first to have a men's basketball national title vacated by the NCAA. They also faced a monetary fine for revenue the university made from advertisements during the Final Fours and National Championship.

The university filed an appeal, but the NCAA upheld the findings and punishments on February 20, 2018.

On September 30, 2019, a group of players on the 2012–13 Cardinals team who were not involved in the rules violations settled a lawsuit they had filed against the NCAA. Most of the settlement was confidential, but one portion was authorized to be revealed—while Louisville's team records (including the national title) remained vacated, all honors and statistics for these players were restored. Most notably, Luke Hancock, a plaintiff in the suit, was once again officially recognized as the Most Outstanding Player of the 2013 Final Four.

Notes

References

Louisville
Scandal
Louisville